Nicole Hildebrand (born 22 November 1993) is an Australian rules footballer who last played for Collingwood in the AFL Women's.

Early life
Hildebrand was born in 1993 in Victoria. She was playing for Melbourne University when she was drafted.

AFLW career

Brisbane
Hildebrand was recruited by Brisbane with the number 18 pick in the 2016 AFL Women's draft. She made her debut in the Lions' inaugural game against Melbourne at Casey Fields on 5 February 2017.

Brisbane signed Hildebrand for the 2018 season during the trade period in May 2017.

Collingwood
On 28 May 2018, Hildebrand was traded to Collingwood for pick 40, which was on-traded to Carlton for Lauren Arnell. In April 2019, she was delisted by Collingwood.

Statistics
Statistics are correct to the end of the 2019 season.

|- style="background-color: #eaeaea"
! scope="row" style="text-align:center" | 2017
|style="text-align:center;"|
| 22 || 8 || 0 || 0 || 47 || 7 || 54 || 18 || 10 || 0.0 || 0.0 || 5.9 || 0.9 || 6.8 || 2.3 || 1.3
|- 
! scope="row" style="text-align:center" | 2018
|style="text-align:center;"|
| 22 || 5 || 0 || 0 || 22 || 10 || 32 || 8 || 6 || 0.0 || 0.0 || 4.4 || 2.0 || 6.4 || 1.6 || 1.2
|- style="background-color: #eaeaea"
! scope="row" style="text-align:center" | 2019
|style="text-align:center;"|
| 3 || 2 || 0 || 0 || 10 || 3 || 13 || 3 || 5 || 0.0 || 0.0 || 5.0 || 1.5 || 6.5 || 1.5 || 2.5
|- class="sortbottom"
! colspan=3| Career
! 15
! 0
! 0
! 79
! 20
! 99
! 29
! 21
! 0.0
! 0.0
! 5.3
! 1.3
! 6.6
! 1.9
! 1.4
|}

References

External links

1993 births
Living people
Sportswomen from Victoria (Australia)
Australian rules footballers from Victoria (Australia)
Brisbane Lions (AFLW) players
Collingwood Football Club (AFLW) players
Melbourne University Football Club (VFLW) players